Syntomodrillia triangulos is a species of sea snail, a marine gastropod mollusk in the family Drilliidae.

Description
The length of the shell varies between 6 mm and 8 mm, and can range from several holotype or paratype varieties.

Distribution
This marine species occurs in the Caribbean Sea off the coast of Mexico.

References

 Fallon P.J. (2016). Taxonomic review of tropical western Atlantic shallow water Drilliidae (Mollusca: Gastropoda: Conoidea) including descriptions of 100 new species. Zootaxa. 4090(1): 1–363

External links
 

triangulos
Gastropods described in 2016